Nothovoria is a genus of parasitic flies in the family Tachinidae.

Species
Nothovoria praestans Cortés & González, 1989

Distribution
Chile.

References

Diptera of South America
Dexiinae
Tachinidae genera
Monotypic Brachycera genera